The cycling competitions at the 1920 Summer Olympics in Antwerp consisted of two road racing events and four track racing events, all for men only.  The 50 km track event was held for the first time at these Games.

Medal summary

Road cycling

Track cycling

Participating nations
A total of 103 cyclists from 14 nations competed at the Antwerp Games.

Medal table

References

 
1920 in track cycling
1920
1920 in cycle racing
1920 Summer Olympics events